Fedon may refer to:

Julien Fédon (died 1796?), leader of an uprising in Grenada against British rule
Faidon Matthaiou or Fedon Mattheou (1924-2011), Greek professional basketball player and coach 
Phaedo, a dialogue of the Ancient Greek philosopher Plato